Beastie Boys Video Anthology is a 2000 DVD compilation of video clips by the Beastie Boys.

The compilation was issued by The Criterion Collection as their 100th DVD title. This compilation is Criterion's first, and currently only, music video compilation.

Each music video featured on this set contains numerous video angles and audio mixes which the viewer can mix-and-match with the DVD remote.

Track listing

Disc 1 
 "Intergalactic"
 "Shake Your Rump"
 "Gratitude"
 "Something's Got to Give"
 "Sure Shot"
 "Hey Ladies"
 "Looking Down the Barrel of a Gun"
 "Body Movin'"
 "So What'cha Want"

Disc 2 
 "Sabotage"
 "Shadrach"
 "Three MCs and One DJ"
 "Ricky's Theme"
 "Pass the Mic"
 "Holy Snappers"
 "Root Down"
 "Netty's Girl"
 "Alive"

External links 

Beastie Boys video albums
2000 video albums
Music video compilation albums
2000 compilation albums
Beastie Boys compilation albums
The Criterion Collection